Most vice presidents of the United States have undergone higher education at an American university, college or law school.

Vice president list

References

United States 
United States education-related lists
Education